Huang Feng (黃楓) (born 7 January 1919) is a Chinese-born Hong Kong-based film director, screenwriter and actor. 

Huang was a native of Hefei, Anhui, China. He started his career as an actor, then became a screenwriter and assistant director, before being promoted to a director by Raymond Chow. He is credited with discovering martial artist and actress Angela Mao. Huang announced his retirement in 1980.

Filmography
 Frosty Night (1957) (writer)
 A Marriage for Love (1957) (writer)
 Appointment After Dark (1958) (writer)
 Lady Jade Locket (1967) (writer)
 The Crimson Charm (1970) (director, writer)
 The Angry River (1970) (director)
 The Fast Sword (1971) (director, writer)
 The Jade-faced Assassin (1971) (writer)
 Lady Whirlwind (1972) (director)
 Bandits from Shantung (1972) (director, writer)
 The Opium Trail (1972) (director)
 Hapkido (1972) (director)
 Kickmaster (1973) (writer)
 When Taekwondo Strikes (1973) (director)
 Stoner (1974) (director, writer)
 The Tournament (1974) (director)
 The Himalayan (1975) (director)
 Shaolin Plot (1977) (director)
 The Iron-Fisted Monk (1977) (writer)
 Naked Comes the Huntress (1978) (director, writer)
 The Legendary Strike (1978) (director)
 The Cunning Hustler (1978) (director)
 The Last Judgement (1979) (director)

References

External links
 
 HK cinemagic entry (includes pictures)

1919 births
Possibly living people
Hong Kong film directors